The  was a secret agreement between the Empire of Japan and the Republic of China that was concluded on 10 June 1935, two years prior to the outbreak of general hostilities during the Second Sino-Japanese War.

Background 
Since 1931, Japan had been provoking numerous incidents  and violating Chinese sovereignty. The Tanggu Truce established a demilitarized zone between Japanese-occupied territories and North China in 1933, but conflict continued unabated by proxy armies in Inner Mongolia. However, with the appointment of Kōki Hirota as Foreign Minister of Japan, the Japanese civilian government attempted to improve Sino-Japanese relations. On 22 January 1935, Japan announced a policy of nonaggression against China. In response, the Chinese government's Wang Jingwei announced a suspension of the Chinese boycott of Japanese goods, and both countries agreed to upgrade relations to the ambassadorial level.

However, the improved relations between Japan and China were counter to the aims of the Japanese Kwantung Army for further territorial expansion.

On 29 May 1935, General Takashi Sakai, Chief of Staff of the Japanese China Garrison Army based in Tianjin, acting on the pretext that two pro-Japanese heads of a local news service had been assassinated, raised a formal protest to Kuomintang General He Yingqin, Acting Chairman of the Peiping National Military Council. The Japanese Army demanded the dismissal of Hebei Provincial Chairman General Yu Xuezhong from his posts and for the Kuomintang to cease all political activities in Hebei, including the cities of Tianjin and Beijing (Peiping).

On 30 May, Japanese armored forces paraded in front of the Chinese government offices in a show of force. On 4 June, Sakai repeated his demands and threatened drastic action if the demands were not fully accepted. However, on 5 June, additional demands were added:

 The replacement of Tianjin Mayor Chang Ting-ngo and Chief of Police Lee Chun-hsiang and the relief of Commander of the 3rd Military Police Regiment Chiang Hsiao-hsien and Director of the Political Training Department Ts'eng Kwang-ching.
 The withdrawal of Kuomintang military force from Hebei.
 The disbarment of all anti-Japanese organizations throughout China, especially the Blue Shirts Society
 The assassins of the heads of pro-Japanese news services to be apprehended and dealt with, with compensation to be paid to the victims' families

On 7 June, forward units of the Kwantung Army moved to the front lines at the Great Wall. A verbal ultimatum was issued on 9 June, with a deadline for compliance set of 12 June.

Not prepared at the time to go to war with Japan since his forces were still tied down in a campaign to exterminate the Chinese Communist Party, Chiang Kai-shek agreed to comply. The agreement was between General Yoshijirō Umezu, who was commander in chief of the Kwantung Army for Japan, and He Yingqin for China.

Aftermath
The agreement gave Japan virtual control over the province of Hebei under the aegis of the East Hebei Autonomous Council. Although the agreement was reached in secret, its details were soon leaked to the press, which caused an upsurge in indignation and anti-Japanese sentiment in China. The truce lasted until 7 July 1937, with the start of the Second Sino-Japanese War.

References

External links
 Text of agreement

Second Sino-Japanese War
1935 in China
Treaties of the Republic of China (1912–1949)
Interwar-period treaties
Treaties concluded in 1935
Treaties entered into force in 1935
Treaties of the Empire of Japan
China–Japan treaties